Augusta Viktoria of Schleswig-Holstein   (Auguste Viktoria Friederike Luise Feodora Jenny; 22 October 1858 – 11 April 1921) was the last German Empress and Queen of Prussia by marriage to Wilhelm II, German Emperor.

Biography

Early life and family

Augusta Victoria was born at Dolzig Castle, the eldest daughter of Frederick VIII, future Duke of Schleswig-Holstein-Sonderburg-Augustenburg, and Princess Adelheid of Hohenlohe-Langenburg,  a niece of Queen Victoria, through Victoria's half-sister Feodora. She grew up at Dolzig until the death of her grandfather, Christian August II, Duke of Schleswig-Holstein-Sonderburg-Augustenburg, in 1869. The family then moved to Castle Primkenau and the estate her father had inherited. She was known within her family as "Dona"

Crown Princess
On 27 February 1881, Augusta married her second cousin Prince Wilhelm of Prussia. Augusta's maternal grandmother Princess Feodora of Leiningen was the half-sister of Queen Victoria, who was Wilhelm's maternal grandmother.

Wilhelm had earlier proposed to his first cousin, Princess Elisabeth of Hesse and by Rhine (known in the family as "Ella"), a daughter of his mother's own sister, but she declined. He did not react well, and was adamant that he would soon marry another princess.

Wilhelm's family was originally against the marriage with Augusta Victoria, whose father was not even a sovereign. However, Chancellor Otto von Bismarck was a strong proponent of the marriage, believing that it would end the dispute between the Prussian government and Augusta's father. In the end, Wilhelm's intransigence, the support of Bismarck, and a determination to move beyond the rejection of his proposal to Ella, led the reluctant imperial family to give official consent.

Empress
Augusta was known as "Dona" within the family. She had a somewhat lukewarm relationship with her mother-in-law, Victoria, who had hoped that Dona would help to heal the rift between herself and Wilhelm; this was not to be the case. The Empress was also annoyed that the title of head of the Red Cross went to Dona, who had no nursing or charity experience or inclination (though in her memoirs, Princess Viktoria Luise paints a different picture, stating that her mother loved charity work). Augusta often took pleasure in snubbing her mother-in-law, usually small incidents, such as telling her that she would be wearing a different dress than the one Victoria recommended, that she would not be riding to get her figure back after childbirth as Wilhelm had no intention of stopping at one son, and informing her that Augusta's daughter, Viktoria, was not named after her (though, again, in her memoirs, Viktoria Luise states that she was named after both her grandmother and her great-grandmother, Queen Victoria).

Augusta and her mother-in-law grew closer for a few years when Wilhelm became emperor, as Augusta was often lonely while he was away on military exercises and turned to her mother-in-law for the companionship of rank, although she never left her children alone with her lest they be influenced by her well-known liberalism. Nevertheless, the two were often seen riding in a carriage together. Augusta was at Victoria's bedside when she died of breast cancer in 1901.

Augusta also had less than cordial relationships with some of Wilhelm's sisters, particularly the recently married Crown Princess Sophie of Greece. In 1890, when Sophie announced her intention to convert to Greek Orthodoxy, Dona summoned her and told her that if she did so, not only would Wilhelm find it unacceptable as the head of the Evangelical State Church of Prussia's older Provinces, but she would be barred from Germany and her soul would end up in Hell. Sophie replied that it was her business whether or not she did. Augusta became hysterical and gave birth prematurely to her son, Prince Joachim, as a result of which she was overprotective of him for the rest of his life, believing that he was delicate. Evidently, so did Wilhelm; he wrote to his mother that if the baby died, Sophie would have murdered it.

Later life
In 1920, the shock of exile and abdication, combined with the breakdown of Joachim's marriage and his subsequent suicide, proved too much for Augusta's health. She died in 1921, in House Doorn at Doorn in the Netherlands. Wilhelm, still reeling over the same losses, was devastated by her death. The Weimar Republic allowed her remains to be transported back to Germany, where they still lie in the Temple of Antiquities, not far from the New Palace, Potsdam. Because he was not permitted to enter Germany, Wilhelm could accompany his wife on her last journey only as far as the German border.

Issue
Augusta gave birth to seven children by Wilhelm II:

Wilhelm, German Crown Prince (1882–1951); married Duchess Cecilie of Mecklenburg-Schwerin.
Prince Eitel Friedrich (1883–1942); married Duchess Sophia Charlotte of Oldenburg.
Prince Adalbert (1884–1948); married Princess Adelaide of Saxe-Meiningen.
Prince August Wilhelm (1887–1949); married Princess Alexandra Victoria of Schleswig-Holstein-Sonderburg-Glücksburg.
Prince Oskar (1888–1958); married Countess Ina Marie von Bassewitz.
Prince Joachim (1890–1920); married Princess Marie-Auguste of Anhalt.
Princess Victoria Louise of Prussia (1892–1980); married Ernest Augustus, Duke of Brunswick.

In literature
The funeral of Augusta Victoria is reflected upon in the novel by Katherine Anne Porter,  Ship of Fools. In it, a German passenger silently reminisces on the funeral and its cinematic showing to a small colony of Germans living abroad in Mexico and describes the outpouring of public grief that was seen within that community. Augusta Victoria's passing is viewed among Germans who lived through the First World War as the ending of a great epoch, the conclusion of which forever divorces them from their maternal country and enshrines Augusta Victoria as a venerable saint and symbol of a Germany long past.

Gallery

Honours

National honours
 Knight Grand Cordon with Collar of the Imperial and Royal Order of the Black Eagle
 Knight Grand Cordon of the Imperial and Royal Order of the Red Eagle
 Grand Mistress Dame of the Imperial and Royal Decoration of Louise, Special Class
 Knight Grand Cordon of the Imperial and Royal Order of Saint John
 Grand Mistress Dame of the Imperial and Royal Decoration of the Cross for Merit, Special Class
 Grand Mistress Dame of the Imperial and Royal Decoration of the Cross of Merit, Special Class
 Knight of the Imperial and Royal Decoration of the Red Cross, 1st Class, 22 October 1898
 Knight of the Imperial and Royal Decoration of the Cross of Jerusalem
  Bavarian Royal Family: Dame of the Royal Decoration of Saint Elizabeth, Special Class
  Bavarian Royal Family: Dame Grand Cross of the Royal Order of Theresa
  Bavarian Royal Family: Dame of the Royal Decoration of Saint Anne, Special Class
  Saxonian Royal Family: Dame Grand Cross of the Royal Order of Sidonia
  Saxonian Royal Family: Dame of the Royal Decoration of Maria Anna, Special Class
  Württembergian Royal Family: Dame of the Royal Decoration of Olga, Special Class, 1889
  Lippean Princely Family: Dame of the Princely Decoration of Bertha, Special Class

Foreign honours
  Austrian Imperial and Royal Family:
 Dame Grand Cross of the Imperial and Royal Order of Elizabeth, in Diamonds, 1900
 Dame of the Imperial and Royal Order of the Starry Cross, 1st Class
  Portuguese Royal Family: Dame Grand Cross of the Royal Order of Saint Isabel
  Romania: Dame Grand Cross of the Order of Carol I
  Russian Imperial Family: Dame Grand Cordon of the Imperial Order of Saint Catherine
  Spanish Royal Family: 830th Dame Grand Cross of the Royal Order of Queen Maria Luisa, 16 May 1881
 : Dame Grand Cordon of the Order of the Precious Crown, 13 April 1902
  Turkey: Dame Grand Cordon with Chain of the Order of Charity, Special Class
 : Dame of the Royal Order of Victoria and Albert, 1st Class
 : Recipient of the Queen Victoria Diamond Jubilee Medal

Arms

Ancestry

See also 

 Empress Augusta Bay on Bougainville Island is named after the Empress.
 The Empress of Germany's bird of paradise, Paradisaea raggiana augustavictoriae, was named in her honour. 
 The Augusta Victoria Hospital in Jerusalem was built by Wilhelm II and named after his wife.
 There is a white rose cultivar named after her, the Kaiserin Auguste Viktoria (Peter Lambert, 1891).

References

Sources

Van der Kiste, John: The last German Empress: A life of Empress Augusta Victoria, Consort of Emperor William II. CreateSpace, 2015
Thomas Weiberg: … wie immer Deine Dona. Verlobung und Hochzeit des letzten deutschen Kaiserpaares. Isensee-Verlag, Oldenburg 2007, .

External links

Historical footage of the burial of Auguste Viktoria in April 1921, filmportal.de

 

1858 births
1921 deaths
People from Lubsko
People from the Province of Brandenburg
House of Augustenburg
Dames of the Order of Saint Isabel
Ladies of the Royal Order of Victoria and Albert
Grand Cordons of the Order of the Precious Crown
German empresses
Princesses of Schleswig-Holstein-Sonderburg-Augustenburg
Prussian princesses
Prussian royal consorts
Wilhelm II, German Emperor